The Nwagu Aneke script is a syllabary and some logographs that was developed by Nwagu Aneke for the Umuleri dialect of Igbo in the late 1950s. Aneke, a successful land owner and diviner, claimed to have had no prior reading or writing skills, and that he was  inspired by spirits who revealed the characters to him. The script does not have any vowels but is similar to other West African scripts invented in the 19th and 20th centuries such as the Vai syllabary because it has characters for sounds that are not in the Latin script. Aneke had written over 100 textbooks worth of anti-colonial commentary works and diary entries such as The Spirits Implore Me to Record All They Have Taught Me and I Went Round the World before his death in 1991.

References

Igbo language
Writing systems of Africa
Syllabary writing systems